Spialia kituina, the Kitui grizzled skipper, is a butterfly in the family Hesperiidae. It is found in north-western, central and eastern Kenya.

The larvae feed on Sida species.

References

Spialia
Butterflies described in 1896
Butterflies of Africa
Taxa named by Ferdinand Karsch